"Dear Future Self (Hands Up)" is a song by American rock band Fall Out Boy featuring Haitian rapper Wyclef Jean. It was released on September 10, 2019, on DCD2 and Island Records as a single from their  compilation album, Greatest Hits: Believers Never Die – Volume Two.

Background

In October 2009, Fall Out Boy announced their first greatest hits album, Believers Never Die – Greatest Hits. The compilation album was released on November 17, 2009. Nearly ten years after the release of the album, the  band announced Believers Never Die Volume Two – Greatest Hits, with a scheduled release date of November 15, 2019. The announcement coincides with the Hella Mega Tour announcement, a concert tour scheduled to take place from June to August 2020 with American rock bands Green Day and Weezer, in Europe and the United States.

Composition
"Dear Future Self (Hands Up)" was written by Fall Out Boy, Wyclef Jean, Jens Siverstedt, Jonas Wallin, and Noonie Bao. The chorus samples "Hands Up" by Inna. The track has a runtime of 2 minutes and 51 seconds. In an interview with Zane Lowe on Apple Music's radio station Beats 1, Pete Wentz spoke about the composition of the song:

Aaron Grech of MXDWN described the song as blending "elements of Fall Out Boy's pop punk style, mixed in with eclectic dance hall inspired rhythms", while overall labeling "Dear Future Self (Hands Up)" as a "summer pop song".

Credits and personnel
Fall Out Boy
 Patrick Stump – lead vocals, lead guitar, programming, production, composing
 Pete Wentz – bass guitar, composing
 Joe Trohman – lead guitar, composing, vocals
 Andy Hurley – drums, percussion, composing, vocals

Additional personnel
 Wyclef Jean – featured artist, composing, production, vocals
 Suzy Shinn – co-producer, recording engineer, backing vocals
 Jens Siverstedt – production, composing
 Wesley Seidman – recording engineer
 Mark "Spike" Stent – mixing engineer
 Michael Freeman – assistant engineer
 Noonie Bao – additional vocals, composing
 Randy Merrill – mastering engineer

Charts

Weekly charts

Year-end charts

References

2019 singles
2019 songs
Fall Out Boy songs
Inna
Island Records singles
Songs written by Patrick Stump
Songs written by Pete Wentz
Songs written by Andy Hurley
Songs written by Joe Trohman
Songs written by Noonie Bao
Songs written by Wyclef Jean
Surf rock songs
Wyclef Jean songs